Janesville Ice Arena is an ice arena and skating center owned by the city of Janesville, Wisconsin.  It is home to the Janesville Jets, a North American Hockey League team, and hosts high school and youth hockey programs.

History
In preparation for the Janesville Jets, the rink underwent a renovation that included new locker rooms and improved public areas such as the ticket booths and concession stand.

In 2012, the Janesville Ice Arena completed a major upgrade, which included new under floor piping, a concrete floor, a domestic hot water boiler, high efficiency lighting, updated locker rooms and a building addition that included a snow melt pit, a zamboni garage, and a geothermal heat pump.

References

External links
City of Janesville page for arena
Janesville Jets

Buildings and structures in Janesville, Wisconsin
Indoor ice hockey venues in Wisconsin
1974 establishments in Wisconsin
Sports venues completed in 1974